Paul McEuen (born 1963) is an American physicist. He received his B.S. in engineering physics at the University of Oklahoma (1985), and his Ph.D. in applied physics at Yale University (1991). After postdoctoral work at MIT (1990–1991), he became an assistant professor at the University of California, Berkeley. He moved to Cornell University in 2001, where he is currently the Goldwin Smith Professor of Physics. He is one of the experts on the electrical property of carbon nanotubes and is a member of the National Academy of Sciences.

Research focus
Paul McEuen studies the electrical and mechanical properties of carbon nanotubes, scanning probe microscopy of nanostructures, molecular electronics, and applications of nanoelectronics in chemistry and biology. His group publishes their work frequently in Nature and Science, and Paul has a Hirsch number of 53.

Novel
McEuen wrote a scientific thriller, Spiral (released in 2011), in which an emeritus Cornell biology professor is murdered as part of a plot involving a biological weapon, which received positive reviews by the New York Times and the Los Angeles Times. The German translation became available on October 29, 2010. McEuen sold the movie rights for "Spiral" to Chockstone Pictures.

Positions
 Goldwin Smith Professor of Physics,  Cornell University, (2008–present)
 Professor, Physics, Cornell University, (2001–present)
 Associate Professor, Physics, University of California, Berkeley (1996-2000)
 Assistant Professor, Physics, University of California, Berkeley (1992-1996)
 Postdoctoral researcher, MIT (1990-1991)

Awards and fellowships
 National Academy of Sciences (2011)
 American Physical Society Fellow (2003)
 Agilent Technologies Europhysics Prize (2001)
 Packard Foundation Interdisciplinary Fellow (1999)
 LBNL Outstanding Performance Award (1997)
 National Young Investigator (1993-1998)
 Packard Foundation Fellow (1992-1997)
 Alfred P. Sloan Foundation Fellow (1992-1994)
 Office of Naval Research Young Investigator (1992-1995)

Other contributions
 McEuen has written Chapter 18, Nanostructures of Kittel's famous textbook Introduction to Solid State Physics (8ed).
 McEuen, along with others, helped uncover the Schön scandal.

References

External links
 McEuen Lab Homepage at Cornell University
 Paul McEuen's Department of Physics Faculty Home Page, Cornell University
 McEuen wins 2001 Agilent Technologies Europhysics Prize for Outstanding Achievement in Condensed Matter Physics

1963 births
Living people
21st-century American physicists
American nanotechnologists
Carbon scientists
Cornell University faculty
Cornell Laboratory of Atomic and Solid State Physics
Yale University alumni
University of Oklahoma alumni
Members of the United States National Academy of Sciences
Fellows of the American Physical Society
Nanophysicists